Sandestin Golf and Beach Resort is a  destination resort in Miramar Beach, Florida, United States, on Northwest Florida's Gulf Coast. The resort is located between the Gulf of Mexico and the Choctawhatchee Bay.

History
Sandestin was built on undeveloped land but was designed to look like it had grown out of a historic fishing village.

Facilities
Sandestin has 30 neighborhoods with 1,600 condominiums, houses, villas, town homes, and hotel accommodations.  The accommodations are group into four resort areas: Beachside, Village, Bayside, and Lakeside (formerly Dockside).

Sandestin has two conference centers – Linkside Conference Center and Baytowne Conference Center.

The Village of Baytowne Wharf in Sandestin is the resort's central dining and retail venue, with shops and boutiques, restaurants and eateries, and nightlife.

Activities
Sandestin has over seven miles (11 km) of beaches and bay front, four golf courses, 15 tennis courts, 19 swimming pools, a 113-slip marina, children's programs, a fitness center and spa. It also includes  a zip line, carousel, ropes course, and bungee jump.

Sandestin has 15 private tennis courts in hard and Hydrogird clay. The tennis center includes a clubhouse, private tennis courts, ladies tennis and children's offerings, and a tennis shop.

Spa Sandestin provides hairstyling, nail design, facials, therapeutic body treatments and massage.

The Sandestin Fitness Center has specialized services and equipment supported by certified instructors.

Sandestin has jet skis, canoes, boogie boards, kayaks, pontoon boats, sailing, snorkeling and scuba diving. The Baytowne Marina also offers evening cruises, bay fishing and deep sea fishing.

Golf

Sandestin has three public golf courses, plus the semi-private Burnt Pine Golf Course.

The Raven Golf Club was designed by Robert Trent Jones, Jr. and opened for play in March 2000. It annually hosts a PGA Champions Tour Stop. This course meanders through wetlands and is noted for water features, bunkering and fairways lined with tall pines. The Tifeagle greens are fast in speed.

Burnt Pine Golf Club was designed by architect Rees Jones, and opened for play in 1994. This 18-hole course winds through wetlands and marshes. The many water features of this course come into play on 14 holes including three holes on the bay. The greens are medium in size and fast in speed with large undulations.

Baytowne Golf Club is Tom Jackson's second golf course at Sandestin; it opened in 1984 and was renovated in 2005. The rolling fairways of this course are lined with tall pines and lead to large, undulating greens that are moderate in speed. Water comes into play on twelve holes and the entire course is heavily bunkered.

The Links Golf Club winds alongside the Choctawhatchee Bay. Designed by architect Tom Jackson, this course opened for play in 1973. The medium-sized greens are moderately undulating and moderate in speed. Water hazards come into play on 14 holes including five holes on the bay.

References

External links

Unincorporated communities in Walton County, Florida
Populated coastal places in Florida on the Gulf of Mexico
Beaches of Walton County, Florida
Beaches of Florida
Unincorporated communities in Florida